The 24th congressional district of Illinois was a congressional district for the United States House of Representatives in Illinois. It was eliminated as a result of the redistricting cycle after the 1980 Census. It was last represented by Paul Simon who was redistricted into the 22nd district.

List of members representing the district

Electoral history

1980 – 1972

1970 – 1962

1960 – 1952

1950 – 1942

1940 – 1932

1930 – 1922

1920 – 1912

1910 – 1902

References 

 Congressional Biographical Directory of the United States 1774–present

Former congressional districts of the United States
24
1903 establishments in Illinois
Constituencies established in 1903
1983 disestablishments in Illinois
Constituencies disestablished in 1983